The Big Parade is a 1986 Chinese film directed by Chen Kaige. It is the story of a tough drill sergeant and his raw recruits, and was photographed by Zhang Yimou.

Today, the film stands somewhat in the shadows to Chen Kaige's better-known works, including his directorial debut Yellow Earth and the Palme d'Or winning Farewell, My Concubine.

Background 
The Big Parade is often seen as an exploration of the relationship of collectivism versus individualism. At the time, however, some western critics, including the New York Times, took the film at face value, seeing it as propagandist and describing it as a "boot camp" film.  The New York Times, in particular, derided the film as a "Recruiting Poster for Collective Action." If critics felt that this was merely China's newest propaganda film, this was due in part to the heavy hand of the Chinese Film Bureau. Originally, Chen had not shot an actual parade to conclude his film, only obscure silhouettes of soldiers against a sunset, an artistic decision that shocked "both army and censors." Even forcing the director to insert more traditional imagery, censors nevertheless withdrew the film from the 1987 Cannes Film Festival without explanation.

Despite its apparent support of collectivism, some scholars have noted a more ambiguous subtext to the film, suggesting that the film's imagery is less simplistic than such early reviews suggested. As one scholar writes, Chen explores the relationship between the collective and the individual, but wants to leave the relationship ambiguous. Another Chinese film scholar, Zhang Yingjin, also sees a subtext of criticism of the Chinese notion of its own nationhood, even as the film's rhetoric veers towards the propagandist.

Cinematography 
One aspect of the film that is not in dispute, however, is Zhang Yimou's photography. The New York Times wrote upon the film's American screening in 1988 that it was "[Zhang's] photography that lifts The Big Parade out of the rudely fashioned trench of its story." Zhang would go on to become a major film director himself, directing his debut, Red Sorghum, in 1987.

References

External links 
 
 
 The Big Parade at the Chinese Movie Database

1986 films
1986 drama films
Films set in Beijing
Films directed by Chen Kaige
1980s Mandarin-language films
Chinese drama films